Big Toys is a 1977 Australian play by Patrick White. It was his first play in 14 years.

Stage productions
The original production was by the Old Tote Theatre Company in Sydney. The cast was Max Cullen, Arthur Dignam and Kate Fitzpatrick and it was directed by Jim Sharman. The play was specifically written for the three lead actors.

Film version

It was adapted into a 1980 TV film by Patrick White. The film was part of the Australian Theatre Festival.

Cast
Diane Cilento as Mag
Max Cullen as Terry
Colin Friels
John Gaden as Ritchie

References

External links

Big Toys at Why Bother With Patrick White
Big Toys at Screen Australia

Plays by Patrick White
Australian drama television films
1977 plays
1980 television films
1980 films
Australian comedy-drama films
Films directed by Chris Thomson (director)
1980s English-language films